Two Timid Souls is a 1928 French silent film comedy directed by René Clair, and based on the 1860 play Les Deux Timides by Eugène Labiche. It was made by the Films Albatros production company. The sets were designed by the art director Lazare Meerson.

Plot
A very shy lawyer, Fremissin, is tasked with defending Garadoux, a man charged rightfully with beating his wife. Fremissin gets nervous at the trial, and ends up demanding the harshest possible sentence for Garadoux, making him spend several months in prison. After a few years, Fremissin has fallen in love with a woman (Cecile Thibaudier). Garadoux sees this and tries to seduce her to get back at Fremissin for getting him sent to prison. Garadoux abuses Fremissin's timid nature, in hilarious acts like posing as a bandit and leaving him disturbing notes telling him not to leave home. After various trials, and meeting his shy counterpart in Cecile's father, Fremissin finally gets to Cecile in time to ask for her hand in marriage, and has a big fight with the Thibaudier and Garadoux family. He then defends the Thibaudier family successfully in court.

Cast
 Pierre Batcheff as Fremissin  
 Jim Gérald as Garadoux  
 Véra Flory as Cecile Thibaudier  
 Maurice de Féraudy as Thibaudier  
 Françoise Rosay as The aunt  
 Madeleine Guitty as The maid 
 Yvette Andréyor as Mme. Garadoux 
 Léon Larive 
 Anna Lefeuvrier 
 Louis Pré Fils 
 Antoine Stacquet
 Odette Talazac

References

Bibliography
 Celia McGerr. René Clair. Twayne Publishers, 1980.

External links

French silent feature films
1928 films
1928 comedy films
Films directed by René Clair
French black-and-white films
French comedy films
Silent comedy films
1920s French films